Jan Tarnowski (c. 1550 – 14 September 1605 in Łowicz, Poland) was Archbishop of Gniezno and Primate of Poland. His coat of arms was Rola.

Jan was secretary of King Stefan Batory of Poland and a trusted adviser of King Sigismund III Vasa of Poland. In 1581 he became Referendarz of the Crown and in 1591 Deputy Chancellor of the Crown. He became also bishop of Poznań in 1598, bishop of Kujawy in 1600 and in 1604 Archbishop of Kraków and simultaneously Primate of Poland.

References

External links
 Virtual tour Gniezno Cathedral  
List of Primates of Poland 

Chancellors of Poland
Archbishops of Gniezno
Bishops of Poznań
16th-century Roman Catholic bishops in the Polish–Lithuanian Commonwealth
17th-century Roman Catholic archbishops in the Polish–Lithuanian Commonwealth
1550s births
1605 deaths
Jan